The 1938 Claxton Shield was the fifth annual Claxton Shield, an Australian national baseball tournament. It was held at the WACA Ground and Subiaco Oval in Perth from 3 to 13 August, the first time Perth had hosted the Shield. New South Wales won the Shield for the second time, successfully defending their title from the previous year. Hosts Western Australia had their best finish, losing to New South Wales in the final to finish second overall. The other participating teams were Victoria and South Australia.

Format
As had been the case in the 1937 tournament, the four teams played a round-robin schedule, meeting each other team once, with two competition points were on offer in each game. The points were awarded as follows:
 Win – two points
 Tie – one point
 Loss – no points
At the end of these preliminary games, the top two teams played each other to determine the champions, while the remaining two teams faced each other to determine third place. In the event of a tie between teams in terms of points, the tiebreaker used would have been the net runs for and against, with the team achieving the greater value placing in the higher position.

Results

Preliminaries

Finals

Third place final

Championship game

References

Bibliography
 
 

Claxton Shield
Claxton Shield
Claxton Shield
August 1938 sports events